Thorybes is a genus of skippers in the family Hesperiidae subfamily Eudaminae.

Species
Thorybes bathyllus (Smith, 1797) - southern cloudywing
Thorybes confusis E. Bell, 1923 – confused cloudywing Florida May be Thorybes mexicana confuses
Thorybes diversus Bell, 1927 - western cloudywing
Thorybes drusius (Edwards, 1883) - Drusius cloudywing Southeast Arizona, Southwest New Mexico, West Texas, Mexico. 
Thorybes mexicana (Herrich-Schäffer, 1869)
Thorybes pylades (Scudder, 1870) - northern cloudywing

References
Natural History Museum Lepidoptera genus database
Thorybes at funet

External links
 Images representing Thorybes  at Consortium for the Barcode of Life

 
Eudaminae
Hesperiidae genera
Taxa named by Samuel Hubbard Scudder